Buy-side analysts ("buy-siders") work for buy side money management firms such as mutual funds, pension funds, trusts, and hedge funds.  They are tasked with identifying investment opportunities that will improve the net worth of the portfolio for which they work.

A buy-side analyst typically works in a mutual fund, pension fund, or other non-brokerage firm, and provides research and recommendations exclusively for the benefit of the company's own money managers (as opposed to individual investors). Unlike sell-side recommendations and reports—which are meant for the analyst's brokerage firm's clients, and the broad outlines of which the press often widely disseminates—buy-side recommendations are not available to anyone outside the firm. If the buy-side analyst stumbles upon a formula, vision, or approach that proves effective, it is kept secret.

See also 

Sell-side analyst
Securities research
Quantitative analysis (finance)

References
 Groysberg, Boris, Healy, Paul M., Chapman, Craig J. and Gui, Yang (August 2005), Do Buy-Side Analysts Out-Perform the Sell-Side?, AAA 2006 Financial Accounting and Reporting Section (FARS),  
 Buy Side at Investopedia.com's dictionary

Financial analysts